M line may refer to:

M-line (mittel line or middle line), a structure in a muscle sarcomere
M Ocean View, a light rail and former streetcar line in San Francisco, California
McKinney Avenue Transit Authority, a streetcar line in Dallas, Texas also named the M-Line
M (Los Angeles Railway), a former streetcar service
Geometrisches Mittel, or Geometric mean
M Line (Kintetsu), Japanese railwayline

See also
M Train (disambiguation), several train services
M1 (disambiguation)#Railways